Cranham is a surname. Notable people with the surname include:

Kenneth Cranham (born 1944), Scottish actor
Scott Cranham (born 1954), Canadian diver

See also
 Cranham